The romanization of Serbian or latinization of Serbian is the representation of the Serbian language using Latin letters. Serbian is written in two alphabets, Serbian Cyrillic, a variation of the Cyrillic alphabet, and Gaj's Latin, or latinica, a variation of the Latin alphabet. The Serbian language is an example of digraphia.

Gaj's Latin alphabet is widely used in Serbia. The two are almost directly and completely interchangeable. Romanization can be done with no errors, but in some cases knowledge of Serbian is required to do proper transliteration from Latin back to Cyrillic. Standard Serbian uses both alphabets currently. A survey from 2014 showed that 47% of the Serbian population favors the Latin alphabet whereas 36% favors Cyrillic; the remaining 17% preferred neither.

Use of romanization

Serbo-Croatian was regarded as a single language since the 1850 Vienna Literary Agreement, to be written in two forms: one (Serb) in the adapted Serbian Cyrillic alphabet; the other (Croat) in the adapted Croatian Latin alphabet, that is to say Gaj's Latin alphabet.

The Latin alphabet was not initially taught in schools in Serbia when it became independent in the 19th century. After a series of efforts by Serbian writers Ljubomir Stojanović and Jovan Skerlić, it became part of the school curriculum after 1914.

During World War I, Austria-Hungary banned the Cyrillic alphabet in Bosnia and its use in occupied Serbia was banned in schools. Cyrillic was banned in the Independent State of Croatia in World War II. The government of socialist Yugoslavia made some initial effort to promote romanization, use of the Latin alphabet even in the Orthodox Serbian and Montenegrin parts of Yugoslavia, but met with resistance. The use of latinica did however become more common among Serbian speakers.

In late 1980s, a number of articles had been published in Serbia about a danger of Cyrillic being fully replaced by Latin, thereby endangering what was deemed a Serbian national symbol.

Following the breakup of Yugoslavia, Gaj's Latin alphabet remained in use in Bosnian and Croatian standards of Serbo-Croatian. Another standard of Serbo-Croatian, Montenegrin, uses a slightly modified version of it.

In 1993, the authorities of Republika Srpska under Radovan Karadžić and Momčilo Krajišnik decided to proclaim Ekavian and Serbian Cyrillic to be official in Republika Srpska, which was opposed both by native Bosnian Serb writers at the time and the general public, and that decision was rescinded in 1994. Nevertheless, it was reinstated in a milder form in 1996, and today still the use of Serbian Latin is officially discouraged in Republika Srpska, in favor of Cyrillic.

Article 10 of the Constitution of Serbia adopted by a referendum in 2006 defined Cyrillic as the official script in Serbia, while Latin was given the status of "Script in official use".

Today Serbian is more likely to be romanized in Montenegro than in Serbia. Exceptions to this include Serbian websites where use of Latin alphabet is often more convenient, and increasing use in tabloid and popular media such as Blic, Danas and Svet. More established media, such as the formerly state-run Politika, and Radio Television of Serbia, or foreign Google News, Voice of Russia and Facebook tend to use Cyrillic script. Some websites offer the content in both scripts, using Cyrillic as the source and auto generating Romanized version.

In 2013 in Croatia there were massive protests against official Cyrillic signs on local government buildings in Vukovar.

Romanization of names

Serbian place names
Serbian place names are consistently spelled in latinica using the mapping that exists between the Serbian Cyrillic alphabet and Gaj's Latin alphabet.

Serbian personal names
Serbian personal names are usually romanized exactly the same way as place names. This is particularly the case with consonants which are common to other Slavic Latin alphabets - Č, Ć, Š, Ž, Dž and Đ.

A problem is presented by the letter Đ/đ that represents the affricate  (the same sound written as <j> in most romanizations of Japanese, similar, though not identical to english <j> as in "Jam"), which is still sometimes represented by "Dj". The letter Đ was not part of the original Gaj's alphabet, but was added by Đuro Daničić in the 19th century. A transcribed "Dj" is still sometimes encountered in rendering Serbian names into English (e.g. Novak Djokovic), though strictly Đ should be used (as in Croatian).

Foreign names

In Serbian, foreign names are phonetically transliterated into both Latin and Cyrillic, a change that does not happen in Croatian and Bosnian (also Latin). This change also happens in some European languages that use the Latin alphabet such as Latvian.
An exception to this are place names which are so well known as to have their own form (exonym): just as English has Vienna, Austria (and not German Wien, Österreich) so Croatian and romanization of Serbian have .

Incomplete romanization
The incomplete romanization of Serbian is written using the English alphabet, also known as ASCII Serbian, by dropping diacritics. It is commonly used in SMS messages, comments on the Internet or e-mails, mainly because users do not have a Serbian keyboard installed. Serbian is a fully phonetic language with 30 sounds that can be represented with 30 Cyrillic letters, or with letters of 27 Gaj's Latin alphabet and three digraphs ("nj" for "њ", ”lj" for "љ", and "dž" for "џ"). In its ASCII form, the number of used letters drops down to 22, as the letters "q", "w", "x" and "y" are not used. This leads to some ambiguity due to homographs, however context is usually sufficient to clarify these issues.

Using incomplete romanization does not allow for easy transliteration back to Cyrillic without significant manual work. Google tried using a machine learning approach to solving this problem and developed an interactive text input tool that enables typing Serbian in ASCII and auto-converting to Cyrillic. However, manual typing is still required with occasional disambiguation selection from the pop-up menu.

Tools for romanization
Serbian text can be converted from Cyrillic to Latin and vice versa automatically by computer. There are add-in tools available for Microsoft Word and OpenOffice.org, as well as command line tools for Linux, MacOS and Windows.

References

Serbian
Serbian language